Marshal of the Court may refer to:
Court Marshal of Denmark
Hofmarschall (Court Marshal), in German princely courts
Marshal of the Court of Lithuania
Marshal of the Court (Serbia, Yugoslavia)
Marshal of the Court (Sweden)
Marshal of the United States Supreme Court
Marszałek, royal official in the Polish-Lithuanian court

See also
Court Martial (disambiguation)
Marshalsea Court, England